Merosargus festivus is a species of soldier fly in the family Stratiomyidae.

Distribution
Brazil.

References

Stratiomyidae
Insects described in 1888
Diptera of South America
Taxa named by Samuel Wendell Williston
Endemic fauna of Brazil